The 2023 specials of the British science-fiction television programme Doctor Who are a series of special episodes that will air to celebrate the programme's 60th anniversary. The episodes were written by Russell T Davies, and will be broadcast on BBC One in November 2023 in the United Kingdom and Ireland, and on Disney+ internationally. David Tennant and Catherine Tate are both returning to the series as part of the 60th anniversary. Tennant will appear as the Fourteenth Doctor for the first time while Tate will reprise her role as Donna Noble.

The three specials were directed by Rachel Talalay, Tom Kingsley, and Chanya Button, respectively. Filming moved from Roath Lock Studios to Wolf Studios once Bad Wolf became a coproducer of the series; filming commenced in May 2022 and was completed by July.

Episodes

Casting

David Tennant and Catherine Tate will both return to the series as part of the 60th anniversary.  Tennant will appear as the Fourteenth Doctor for the first time while Tate will reprise her role as Donna Noble. Ncuti Gatwa will make his debut appearance as the Fifteenth Doctor.

On 13 June 2022, Davies announced that Neil Patrick Harris would be joining the cast, playing an undisclosed role, in a villainous capacity. On 25 December 2022, it was announced that Jacqueline King and Karl Collins are also set to return as Sylvia Noble and Shaun Temple, respectively and that Ruth Madeley would appear as Shirley Anne Bingham.  Yasmin Finney joined the cast for the anniversary, to portray a character named Rose. Bernard Cribbins is set to posthumously appear as Wilfred Mott.

Production

Development
On 29 July 2021, the BBC announced that Chris Chibnall, who served as executive producer and showrunner of the series since 2018, would depart the series after a run of specials in 2022, alongside Thirteenth Doctor star Jodie Whittaker. In the BBC press release, Chibnall is quoted as saying: "I wish our successors - whoever the BBC and BBC Studios choose - as much fun as we've had. They're in for a treat!" The future of the programme was first teased by Piers Wenger on 25 August 2021, when he said an upcoming change for Doctor Who would be "radical".

On 24 September 2021, the BBC announced Russell T Davies would return to Doctor Who as showrunner, after having previously acted as showrunner from 2005–2010 for the Ninth and Tenth Doctors. He will succeed Chibnall for the show's 60th anniversary in 2023 and beyond. Davies will be joined by the Bad Wolf production company, which was founded by former Doctor Who executive producer Julie Gardner and former BBC head of drama Jane Tranter. In October 2021, it was announced that Sony would acquire a majority of Bad Wolf. Bad Wolf also took over creative control of Doctor Who beginning with the specials, allowing the BBC to focus on establishing Doctor Who as a global brand.

Phil Collinson returned to the show as executive producer, having previously produced episodes from 2005–2008. Davies confirmed by March 2022 that production had begun at Bad Wolf Studios in Cardiff. William Oswald is also editing for the new series, having last edited for Doctor Who in "Twice Upon a Time" (2017). Tranter and Gardner will also act as executive producers alongside newcomer Joel Collins.

Writing
In December 2021, Davies confirmed that he had already written some episodes for the anniversary and succeeding fourteenth series. Scott Handcock will act as script editor for the series, having previously worked on Doctor Who Confidential, The Sarah Jane Adventures, and most notably written, produced, directed and acted in numerous Doctor Who audio dramas for Big Finish Productions. The episodes are set to include the characters Beep the Meep and the Wrarth Warriors.

Filming
Filming for the programme is set to mark a change in the studio location, with the new studio, Wolf Studios, taking over from Roath Lock Studios as the company for in-house filming, where the programme has filmed since 2012. This change came about as Bad Wolf was set to co-produce along with the BBC going forward. Bad Wolf further filed for a new subsidiary company, also run by Gardner and Tranter, called "Whoniverse1 LTD".

Filming for the specials commenced in May 2022 in the London Borough of Camden, and concluded that July. Rachel Talalay returned to direct the first special; Tom Kingsley directed the second, and Chanya Button directed the third. Vicki Dellow and Chris May will produce the specials with Ellen Marsh co-producing. Cribbins had completed filming shortly before his death in July 2022.

Production blocks were arranged as follows:

Music
On 20 July 2022, Segun Akinola, who had served as composer since 2018, confirmed that he would not return for the 60th anniversary specials.

Release

Promotion
On 7 March 2023, it was announced that Tennant, who is the main presenter of Comic Relief 2023, would appear during a sketch in the telethon in character as the Fourteenth Doctor to promote the series.

Broadcast

Three specials are set to be aired in November 2023, marking Doctor Whos 60th anniversary. In October 2022, the BBC and Disney Branded Television announced that the specials would be the first Doctor Who episodes to be released internationally on Disney+, while continuing to be aired on BBC One in the United Kingdom.

References

Anniversary television episodes
British television specials
Television shows written by Russell T Davies
Upcoming television seasons